Monika Pisankaneva (born 1968) is a Bulgarian lecturer and LGBT activist. She worked for the Bulgarian organization Gemini, an LTBT rights group, between 1998 and 2001. She founded the Bilitis Resource Center, an organization which facilitates networking and outreach for women LGBT community members in Sofia in 2004, serving as its director until 2017. She was one of the first academics to publish about LGBT rights in Bulgaria. In addition to her activism, she works with national and international civil-service organizations overseeing various human rights projects.

Early life and education
Monika Pisankaneva was born in Sofia, in the People's Republic of Bulgaria in 1968. After earning a degree in philosophy in 1992 from Sofia University, she went abroad to continue her education. She graduated in 1998 from the University of Amsterdam with a degree in European studies, with a focus on social science. In 2007, she earned a master's degree in philanthropy from the University of Bologna.

Career
Pisankaneva returned to Bulgaria in 1998 and began working in an NGO which provided civil service programs. She has lectured on sexual identities at New Bulgarian University since 2000. In 1998, she began volunteering at the LGBT organization Gemini and worked with the group through 2001. In 2004, Pisankaneva founded the Bilitis Resource Center in Sofia and served as its director until 2017. The organization serves as a networking and outreach program for lesbian, transgender, and bisexual women. She began working on the Sofia Pride Organizing Committee in 2009. In 2019, she organized a panel discussion for the rights to free movement for same-sex families within the European Union with the Bulgarian candidate for the European Parliament, Toma Belev and Zaritsa Georgieva, a representative of the Green Movement. Belev signed a public promise to serve as an advocate for the LGBT community if he was elected. 

Pisankaneva has served as a project manager at the national and international level for various service organizations operating in Sofia. She currently manages a research project, "Towards Inclusive of LGBTI Students and Staff School Policies", which evaluates and makes recommendations for improvement of security and inclusiveness of school policies with regard to LGBT staff and students. where she researches school policies in Sofia to analyze protection levels of LGBT students and staff. She also manages the Workshop for Civic Initiatives Foundation's philanthropic development program. In 2017, she was nominated for the Bulgarian Helsinki Committee's Human of the Year Award as the " longest-serving open LGBTI activist in Bulgaria". In 2018, the Bilitis Resource Center was a co-honoree of the Bulgarian Helsiniki Committee's Activist of the Year Award, with the organizations Deystvie and the GLAS Foundation for their joint venture to found the first LGBT community center in Bulgaria, the Rainbow Hub.

Selected works
Pisankaneva began researching and publishing about Bulgaria's LGBT community in 2000 and was a pioneer in creating source materials about homosexuality in the country. She has published various works, including articles for international journals and encyclopedias. Among them are:

 English version

References

Citations

Bibliography

1968 births
Living people
People from Sofia
Sofia University alumni
University of Amsterdam alumni
University of Bologna alumni
Academic staff of New Bulgarian University
Human rights activists
Bulgarian LGBT rights activists
Bulgarian LGBT people
20th-century LGBT people
21st-century LGBT people
Bulgarian women activists